Adam Gawlas (born 18 February 2002) is a Czech professional darts player who plays in Professional Darts Corporation (PDC) events.

Career
Gawlas qualified for his first PDC European Tour tournament in mid-2019, when he qualified for the 2019 Austrian Darts Championship, and he defeated Ross Smith in the first round, before losing to eventual champion Mensur Suljović in the second round. 

He finished third in the JDC World Cup with the Czech junior team. Gawlas also achieved another third place finish with the Czech junior team, this time the European Youth Cup.

He then made it to the 2019 JDC World Championship final, where he beat Justin Hewitt with 5–3 and lost to Keane Barry with 3-5.

Gawlas also played in the final of the 2019 PDC World Youth Championship, but he lost to Luke Humphries 6-0. The result qualified him for 2020 Grand Slam of Darts.

In early 2020 he made his first attempt at the European Q-School. In the final tournament he achieved his best result of the week when he made it into the last 32; in the other 3 events, he finished in the last 512, the last 256 and the last 128. A few weeks later he qualified for The 2020 Austrian Darts Championship, although the tournament has been postponed due to the coronavirus outbreak. In April 2020 he became one of the ten players of newly found 2020 Tipsport Premier League. 

Gawlas won a PDC Tour Card for the first time at European Qualifying School in February 2021.

On 17 December 2022 he became the first Czech player in history to reach second round at PDC World Darts Championship beating Richie Burnett 3–2 in the first round. 

In 2023, Gawlas was the first Czech player to reach the semi-finals at the UK Open. However, he lost this game to Andrew Gilding.

World Championship results

PDC
 2023: Second round (lost to Ryan Searle 0–3)

Performance timeline

PDC European Tour

(W) Won; (F) finalist; (SF) semifinalist; (QF) quarterfinalist; (#R) rounds 6, 5, 4, 3, 2, 1; (RR) round-robin stage; (Prel.) Preliminary round; (DNQ) Did not qualify; (DNP) Did not participate; (NH) Not held; (EX) Excluded; (WD) Withdrew

References

External links

2002 births
Living people
People from Třinec
Czech darts players
Professional Darts Corporation current tour card holders
PDC World Cup of Darts Czech team